Bobo Sport is a Burkinabé football club based in Bobo-Dioulasso and founded in 1947. They play their home games at the Stade Wobi Bobo-Dioulasso.

Football clubs in Burkina Faso
Bobo-Dioulasso
Association football clubs established in 1947
1947 establishments in French Upper Volta